Cuba Lodge No. 312 A.F. and A.M. is a historic Masonic lodge located at Cuba, Crawford County, Missouri. It was built in 1940, and is a one-story, rectangular building constructed of dressed, random ashlar, native sandstone.  It has a front gabled-hip roof and a projecting front gable roof porch.

It was listed on the National Register of Historic Places in 2014.

References

Clubhouses on the National Register of Historic Places in Missouri
Buildings and structures completed in 1940
Buildings and structures in Crawford County, Missouri
National Register of Historic Places in Crawford County, Missouri